1933 was the 40th season of County Championship cricket in England. Yorkshire's dominance continued with a third successive title. England defeated the touring West Indies 2–0.

Honours
County Championship – Yorkshire
Minor Counties Championship – undecided
Wisden – Fred Bakewell, George Headley, Stan Nichols, Leslie Townsend, Cyril Walters

Test series

West Indies tour

In a three-match series, England defeated West Indies 2–0 with one match drawn.

County Championship

Leading batsmen
Wally Hammond topped the averages with 3323 runs @ 67.81

Leading bowlers
Hedley Verity topped the averages with 190 wickets @ 13.43

References

Annual reviews
 Wisden Cricketers' Almanack 1934

External links
 CricketArchive – season summary

1933 in English cricket
English cricket seasons in the 20th century